Tate-machi is a Hiroden station (tram stop) on Hiroden Main Line, located in Tate-machi, Naka-ku, Hiroshima.

Routes
From Tate-machi Station, there are three of Hiroden Streetcar routes.

 Hiroshima Station - Hiroshima Port Route
 Hiroshima Station - Hiroden-miyajima-guchi Route
 Hiroshima Station - Eba Route

Connections
█ Main Line
  
Hatchobori — Tate-machi — Kamiya-cho-higashi

Around station
Hiroshima Hondori Syoutengai
Tokyu Hands Hiroshima
Hiroshima Kokusai Gakuin University Tate-machi campus
Hiroshima Andersen

History
Opened as "Kougai-Bus-mae" on June 10, 1952.
Renamed to the present name, "Tate-machi" on July 29, 1957.

See also
Hiroden Streetcar Lines and Routes

References

Tate-machi Station
Railway stations in Japan opened in 1952